(Light Cavalry) is an operetta in two acts by Franz von Suppé, with a libretto by . It was first performed in the Carltheater, Vienna, on 21 March 1866.

The original work is set in a 19th-century Austrian village where several love intrigues and the discovery of a father-daughter relationship are accompanied by the arrival of a regiment of hussars. In 1934,  completely rewrote the operetta. It was set in the 18th century amid the court intrigues of a Baron and his Hungarian Countess lover, whose ballet company is referred to as the "light cavalry".

While much of the operetta remains in relative obscurity, the Light Cavalry Overture is one of Suppé's best known works. The music from the operetta was used as the soundtrack of a film of the same name in 1935.

Roles

Plot

Act 1 - The Marketplace
Vilma is an orphan who was educated by the community. Now she has become a pretty young woman and turns her head on all men, including those who are already married. In response, the men's wives complain to the mayor, Bums, and the council begins to investigate Vilma's behavior. Bums and Pankraz are secretly in love with Vilma, but at the urging of their jealous wives, they have to convene a council to end the banishment of Vilma. The councilors come to no result (song "How clever, how clever, we from the G'meind").

Vilma does not care about the men's talk, because she is in love with Hermann. This idyll is interrupted by the entry of Hungarian Hussars. Under the leadership of their sergeant Janos, the men at the council move into quarters with the citizens, while the female population welcomes the soldiers with cheers.

Act 2 - The Marketplace
Hermann tries to marry Vilma, but to no avail. His guardian, Mayor Bums, refuses his approval, but he still hopes for the young pretty woman. Disappointed, Hermann attempts to join the Hussars and talks to Janos. Janos wants to help Hermann, because he has since noticed for himself the way the decency in this village is ordered. Therefore, he decides to play a trick on the women and men of the village, to teach them a lesson.

Instead of Vilma, though, he lures Eulalia, the wife of Pankraz, to this rendezvous. Eulalia, who is not averse to an affair with Janos, decides to meet Janos at this meeting place. This arranges it so that Apollonia, the wife of Bums, is nearby and can eavesdrop the whole affair. Coincidentally, Carol and Stefan meet at this meeting point in the dark with the civic daughters Dorothea and Regina.

Janos takes pity on the unfortunate lovers, Hermann and Vilma, as he had experienced a similar situation in his youth. When he was young, he loved Zinka, whom he was not allowed to marry because of his poverty. He was forced to leave her, and never saw her again. Remembering his old love, he remembers a song he always sang with Zinka, that he is the only one to know. Suddenly, he hears the same song. But it is not Zinka, but Vilma, who sings this sad song. She learned it from her mother in her childhood.

Janos searches for the singer in the darkness and finds Vilma. His questions indicate that, to the big surprise, Vilma is his daughter. As great as the joy is over finding his daughter, so is his anger at the treatment of Vilma in this city. The trick he had come up with is being completed. After all involved have made as ridiculous as possible, Janos forces the mayor to agree to the wedding between Vilma and Hermann.

When Bums is forced to give his blessing, the signal sounds to march off. The Hussars gather in the marketplace and ride happily back, just as they came. The Light Cavalry has done its duty.

See also

 Light Cavalry

References

External links
 
 Welt der Operette page on original 1866 version, accessed 7 June 2010
 MIDI file of Light Cavalry Overture

German-language operettas
Operas by Franz von Suppé
1866 operas
Operettas